Thicker than Water is a 2005 American made-for-television drama film starring Melissa Gilbert and Lindsay Wagner.  It premiered on Hallmark Channel on March 12, 2005.

Plot summary
After the death of her father, Natalie Travers discovers he was married to a rodeo star before he married Natalie's mother.   Upset that her father kept part of his life a secret from her and bewildered over how a prominent judge could fall for a cowgirl, she sets out to find Maggie Mae Jarrett.  But Natalie meets Maggie's daughter Jessie Mae Jarrett, who is struggling to keep the wild horses on her land alive and safe.

Cast
 Melissa Gilbert as Natalie Travers
 Lindsay Wagner as Jess Jarrett
 Brian Wimmer as Sam Nelson
 Lindy Newton as Lulu Nichols
 Robert Mailhouse as Larry Gorman
 Grainger Hines as Tom Grove
 Nan Martin as Abygail Jordan
 Sondra Currie as Sally

References

External links
 
 Thicker Than Water on Hallmark Channel
 

2005 television films
2005 films
2005 drama films
American drama television films
Hallmark Channel original films
Films directed by David S. Cass Sr.
Larry Levinson Productions
2000s American films
2000s English-language films